Leon Gary Plauché (November 10, 1945 – October 23, 2014) was an American man known for publicly killing Jeff Doucet, who had kidnapped, raped, and molested Plauché's prepubescent son, Jody. The killing occurred on Friday, March 16, 1984, and was captured on camera by a local news crew. For the fatal shooting, Plauché was given a seven-year suspended sentence with five years' probation and 300 hours of community service and received no prison time. The case received wide publicity because some people questioned whether Plauché should have been charged with murder or let off. Plauché contended that he was in the right, and that anyone in a similar position would have taken the same action.

Kidnapping of his son by Doucet 
Gary Plauché lived in Baton Rouge, Louisiana. He was separated from his wife, June, at the time of the shooting. During 1983 and 1984, his 11-year-old son, Jody Plauché, was taking karate lessons with an instructor, 25-year-old Jeffrey Doucet, who had been sexually abusing the boy for at least a year. On February 14, 1984, Doucet kidnapped Jody and took him to a motel in Anaheim, California, where he sexually assaulted and molested him. Police searched the country for Jody, and he was eventually found after Doucet allowed the boy to place a collect call to his mother from the motel. California police raided the motel and arrested Doucet without incident.

On March 1, 1984, Jody was returned to his family in Louisiana, but Gary, who was 38 years old at the time, heard reports that Doucet had sexually assaulted his son. In an interview with a news television crew, Gary stated that he felt a sense of helplessness upon hearing of these reports.

Doucet's killing by Plauché
On March 16, 1984, Doucet was flown back to Louisiana to face trial. Doucet arrived at Baton Rouge Metropolitan Airport, also known as Ryan Field, and was led in handcuffs by police officers through the airport at around 9:30 p.m., where Plauché was waiting for Doucet with a handgun.

An employee of the local ABC affiliate, WBRZ-TV, told Plauché when Doucet would be arriving at the airport. A news crew from WBRZ was waiting for Doucet and had set up their cameras to record his arrival. Opposite the news crew was a bank of pay telephones, where Plauché waited while talking to his best friend on a telephone. He wore a baseball cap and sunglasses, so no one would recognize him.

As Doucet was escorted through the airport, he passed the news crew who were taping the scene. He then walked past Plauché, who took out his handgun and fired a single shot, directly at the right side of Doucet's head, at point-blank range. Doucet immediately fell to the floor, bleeding from a wound close to his right ear. As depicted in the video of the incident, Plauché placed the telephone receiver down before officers restrained him and removed the gun from his other hand and then attended to Doucet. The officers who grabbed hold of Plauché recognized him. They kept him pinned against the bank of telephones, asking him (as captured on the video), "Gary, why? Why, Gary?" The entire incident was captured on ENG videotape. 

Doucet fell into a coma, and died from the gunshot wound the next day.

Aftermath 
Plauché was initially charged with second-degree murder, but agreed to a plea bargain in which he pleaded no contest to manslaughter. He was sentenced to seven years' suspended sentence, with five years' probation and 300 hours of community service, which he completed in 1989.

Psychological reports helped Plauché's case after it was learned that Doucet had abused Jody months prior to the kidnapping. Psychiatrist Edward P. Uzee examined Plauché and determined that he could not tell the difference between right and wrong when he killed Doucet. Plauché's defense team argued that he was driven to a temporarily psychotic state after learning of the abuse of his son. Uzee also determined that Doucet had the ability to manipulate others and took advantage of the fact that Plauché was separated from his wife at the time, and had managed to wedge his way into the Plauché family. Judge Frank Saia ruled that sending Plauché to prison would not help anyone, and that there was virtually no risk of him committing another crime.

The video of Plauché killing Doucet has been featured on many television programs and documentaries, including the 1994 shockumentary Traces of Death II and the 2002 Michael Moore-directed documentary Bowling for Columbine. The footage has also been uploaded to YouTube, where the video has received more than 20 million views. In March 2020, some of the uncensored copies of the video were taken down and re-uploaded in the censored version, but plenty of copies of the original still exist on YouTube and elsewhere. One video featured on YouTube was taken from the television series Anatomy of Crime, which aired in 2000 on Court TV and was produced by John Langley, the creator of Cops.

At age 67, Plauché gave an interview where he stated that he did not regret killing Doucet and would do so again.

In August 2019, the book "Why, Gary, Why?": The Jody Plauché Story" was released by Jody.

Death 
Plauché suffered a stroke in 2011. He died in 2014 at a nursing home after another stroke, a month before his 69th birthday.

See also
 Ellie Nesler
 Marianne Bachmeier

References

1945 births
2014 deaths
American vigilantes
People from Baton Rouge, Louisiana
Vigilantism against sex offenders
American people convicted of manslaughter